Libertia chilensis, synonym Libertia formosa, called the New Zealand satin flower, snowy mermaid, or Chilean-iris, is a species of flowering plant in the iris family, Iridaceae, native to the Juan Fernández Islands, central and southern Chile, and southern Argentina. It can also be found growing wild in the San Francisco Bay Area and San Bernardino County in California, where it is an introduced species. A rhizomatous evergreen perennial, it has gained the Royal Horticultural Society's Award of Garden Merit.

Calle-Calle River in Los Ríos Region owes its name to the Mapuche word for the plant.

References

chilensis
Flora of the Juan Fernández Islands
Flora of Chile
Flora of Argentina
Plants described in 1927